The following lists events that happened during 1944 in the Belgian Congo.

Incumbent

Governor-General – Pierre Ryckmans

Events

See also

 Belgian Congo
 History of the Democratic Republic of the Congo

References

Sources

 
Belgian Congo
Belgian Congo